Strait to Vegas is a concert residency by country music artist George Strait at T-Mobile Arena on the Las Vegas Strip. It has included 17 weekends of concerts, beginning on April 22, 2016, and is scheduled to continue through at least December 3, 2022.

The residency was announced in a press conference on September 22, 2015 at MGM Grand Las Vegas. It was initially scheduled for four dates over two weekends, and has been extended several times since then.

Shows in April, July, and December of 2017 were branded as "2 Nights of Number 1s", with the setlist for each weekend consisting primarily of Strait's 60 chart-topping songs. The September 2017 shows focused on the soundtrack to Strait's film, Pure Country, in honor of its 25th anniversary.

Residency dates
 April 22–23, 2016
 September 9–10, 2016
 December 2–3, 2016
 February 17–18, 2017
 April 7–8, 2017
 July 28–29, 2017
 September 1–2, 2017
 December 8–9, 2017
 February 2–3, 2018
 December 7–8, 2018
 February 1–2, 2019
 August 23–24, 2019
 December 6–7, 2019
 January 31–February 1, 2020
 August 13–14, 2021
 December 3–4, 2021
 February 11–12, 2022
 December 2–3, 2022

Opening acts
 Kacey Musgraves (April 2016–February 2017)
 Cam (April 2017–December 2017)
 Lyle Lovett & Robert Earl Keen (2018)
 Ashley McBryde (2019)
 Gone West (2020)
 Caitlyn Smith (2021 & December 2022)
 Tenille Townes (February 2022)

References

External links
 

Concert residencies in the Las Vegas Valley
George Strait concert tours